Merih Demiral (born 5 March 1998) is a Turkish professional footballer who plays as a centre-back for  club Atalanta and the Turkey national team.

Club career

Early years
A product of the Fenerbahçe youth system, Demiral was signed by Portuguese side  in 2016.

In January 2017, he was loaned out to Sporting B, and made his professional debut in the Segunda Liga for the latter club on 5 February 2017 in a 1–1 home draw against Famalicão. At the end of the season, he was signed outright by the club.

On 15 August 2018, he joined Turkish club Alanyaspor on loan. On 29 January 2019, he permanently joined Alanyaspor for €3.5 million.

Sassuolo 
On 30 January 2019, Demiral joined Italian club Sassuolo on loan with an obligation to buy. He made his Serie A and club debut on 24 February, in a 1–1 home draw against SPAL, and scored his first goals, both for the club and in Serie A—a brace in a 4–0 home win over Chievo—on 4 April.

Juventus
On 5 July 2019, Juventus officially announced the transfer of Demiral from Sassuolo, on a five-year contract for €18 million. His salary was reportedly unfolded as €1.3 million per year. He became the first Turkish player to play for the club. He made his club debut on 21 September, in a 2–1 home win over Verona in Serie A. He subsequently made his Champions League debut on 11 December, in the club's final group match, earning praise in the media for his performance as he helped Juventus keep a clean sheet in a 2–0 away win over Bayer Leverkusen.

He scored his first goal for the club on 12 January 2020, the opener in a 2–1 away win over Roma, which saw Juventus secure the unofficial title of "Winter Champions", though he was later substituted for Matthijs de Ligt after sustaining an anterior cruciate ligament injury. As a result, he was expected to be ruled out for the remainder of the season, including Euro 2020. He returned to action on 1 August, featuring as a substitute in Juventus' 3–1 home defeat to Roma in Serie A, with Juventus already confirmed as league champions.

Loan to Atalanta 
On 6 August 2021, Atalanta announced the signing of Demiral from Juventus on loan with an option to buy. During the 2021–22 season, he accumulated a total of 42 appearances in all competitions, scored two goals, and provided three assists. Atalanta exercised the right to buy on 17 June 2022 for a fee of €20 million.

International career
Demiral represented Turkey at junior levels, including Under-17 and Under-19. He made his debut for the senior squad on 20 November 2018 in a friendly against Ukraine, as an 85th-minute substitute for Mert Müldür. On 11 June 2021, Demiral scored an own goal in a 3–0 defeat against Italy in the first game of the UEFA Euro 2020 campaign; it was the first time in the tournament's history that the match opener kicked off with an own goal.

Style of play
Demiral is usually deployed as a centre-back, in either a three or four-man defence, although he is a versatile player, who is also capable of playing as a right-sided full-back.

An aggressive and instinctive defender, his main traits are his physicality, tactical intelligence, tackling, composure, and determination, which allow to excel at reading plays, and also enable him to anticipate or mark his opponents well. A tall and physically strong defender, he is also known for his ability in the air, which enables him to defend opposing crosses and clear the ball away from his own penalty area. Despite his tall stature and imposing physique, he is also a mobile defender, which allows him to make recoveries, win back the ball effectively, or restrict his opponents' movements when defending off the ball.

Regarded as a promising young defender in the media, due to his characteristics, he has been compared to Nemanja Vidić, whom Demiral himself has also cited as an inspiration. Another one of his influences is his Juventus teammate Giorgio Chiellini, to whom he has also been compared. He has also been likened to former Juventus defender Paolo Montero.

Controversy
On 11 October 2019, following Cenk Tosun's goal in a 1–0 home win over Albania in a Euro 2020 qualifier, Demiral was one of the Turkish players who participated in a controversial "military salute" goal celebration. The same day, he stated his open support for the Turkish offensive into north-eastern Syria on Twitter; while his post was praised by Turkish supporters of the country's President Recep Tayyip Erdoğan, it also drew criticism from numerous football fans of Juventus on social media, as well as those of other clubs, some of whom asked for the club to take disciplinary actions against the player; others even demanded that Demiral be dismissed by the club.

Personal life
On 20 April 2022, Demiral and his Albanian wife Heidi Lushtaku became the parents of a son and made this public a month after the birth.

Career statistics

Club

International

Scores and results list Turkey's goal tally first.

Honours
Juventus
Serie A: 2019–20
Coppa Italia: 2020–21
Supercoppa Italiana: 2020; runner-up: 2019

Turkey U20
Toulon Tournament third place: 2018

References

External links

 Profile at the Atalanta B.C. website
 
 TFF Profile
 

Living people
1998 births
People from Karamürsel
Association football central defenders
Turkish footballers
Turkey youth international footballers
Turkey under-21 international footballers
Turkey international footballers
U.S. Sassuolo Calcio players
Alanyaspor footballers
A.C. Alcanenense players
Sporting CP B players
Juventus F.C. players
Atalanta B.C. players
Serie A players
Süper Lig players
Liga Portugal 2 players
Turkish expatriate footballers
Turkish expatriate sportspeople in Portugal
Turkish expatriate sportspeople in Italy
Expatriate footballers in Portugal
Expatriate footballers in Italy
UEFA Euro 2020 players